Sekukan (also Romanized as Sekūkān) is a village in Hotkan Rural District, in the Central District of Zarand County, Kerman Province, Iran. At the 2006 census, its population was 96, in 24 families.

References 

Populated places in Zarand County